The year 1610 in music involved some significant events.

Events 
Girolamo Diruta dedicates part 2 of his treatise, Il transilvano, to Leonora Orsini Sforza.  This is the last record of Diruta.

Publications 
Adriano Banchieri – , Op. 23 (Necklace of musical pearls) (Venice: Ricciardo Amadino), a collection of motets
Bartolomeo Barbarino
First book of motets for solo voice, either soprano or tenor (Venice: Ricciardo Amadino)
Girolamo Belli – Psalms for five voices and continuo, Op. 20 (Venice: Ricciardo Amadino), also includes two Magnificats and Marian litanies
Joachim a Burck
January 28 –  (Two epithalamia as congratulations on the marriage) (Erfurt: Martin Wittel)
April 23 –  (Three Christian bridal songs) (Jena: Johann Weidner)
Antonio Cifra – Vespers and motets for eight voices, Op. 9 (Rome: Bartolomeo Zannetti)
Giovanni Paolo Cima –  (Ecclesiastical concerti) for one, two, three and four voices with one for five and one for eight, together with a mass, two Magnificats, and six sonatas with 2 to 4 instruments and basso continuo (Milan: Simon Tini & Filippo Lomazzo)
William Corkine – Ayres, to sing and play to the lute and basse violl (London: W. Stansby for John Browne), also includes dance music for the lyra viol
Giovanni Croce – 9 Lamentations for Holy Week for four voices (Venice: Giacomo Vincenti), published posthumously
Christoph Demantius –  for six voices or instruments (Leipzig: Abraham Lamberg), contains settings of selections from the Gospels for the whole year
Eustache Du Caurroy
 (Paris: Pierre Ballard), a collection of psalm settings, published posthumously
 for three, four, five, and six parts (Paris: Pierre Ballard), published posthumously
Michael East – The Third Set Of Bookes ... to 5. and 6. parts: Apt both for Viols and Voyces
Johannes Eccard –   (Königsberg, Georg Osterberger), a wedding song
Melchior Franck
 for four, five, six, and eight voices (Coburg: Justus Hauck)
 for four, five, six, and eight voices (Nuremberg: David Kauffmann)
 for three, four, and five voices (Coburg: Justus Hauck), a birthday song
Bartholomäus Gesius –  for four, five, and six voices (Frankfurt an der Oder: Friedrich Hartmann)
Cesario Gussago –  (Vespers psalms for the whole year) for eight voices (Venice: Ricciardo Amadino)
Andreas Hakenberger –  (New German Songs) for five voices (Danzig: Andreas Hünefeld), a collection of madrigals
Sigismondo d'India
 for two and three voices (Venice: Angelo Gardano), a collection of sacred songs
Orlande de Lassus – Posthumous Masses (Munich: Nicolaus Heinrich)
Claude Le Jeune – Third book of psalms for three voices (Paris: Pierre Ballard), published posthumously
Giovanni de Macque – Third book of madrigals for four voices (Naples: Giovanni Battista Gargano & Lucrezio Nucci)
Simone Molinaro –  for six voices, books 1 & 2 (Venice: Ricciardo Amadino)
Claudio Monteverdi – Vespro della Beata Vergine (Venice: Ricciardo Amadino)
Giovanni Bernardino Nanino – Motets for two, three, and four voices (Rome: Giovanni Battista Robletti)
Germano Pallavicino – Il secondo libro delle fantasie, over ricercare a quattro voci... (Venice: Ricciardo Amadino)
Enrico Antonio Radesca (Radesca di Foggia) – Fourth book of canzonettas, madrigals and arie alla romana for two and three voices (Venice: Giacomo Vincenti)

Classical music 
Georg Patermann – Harmonia for ten voices, to commemorate the wedding of Peter Fueß and Wendula Linsing

Opera 
Giordano Giacobbi – L'Andromeda

Births 
July – Leonora Duarte, Flemish musician and composer (died 1678)
December 9 – Baldassare Ferri, castrato singer (died 1680)
date unknown
Wojciech Bobowski, Polish musician and Ottoman dragoman (died 1675)
Henry Du Mont, French composer (died 1684)
Michel Lambert, French composer of airs (died 1696)

Deaths 
May 2 – Paolo Virchi, organist and composer (born 1551)
May 24 – Joachim a Burck, composer and Lutheran hymnodist (born 1546)

References

 
Music
17th century in music
Music by year